Carabus obsoletus obsoletus is a subspecies of ground beetle from family Carabidae, found in Poland, Romania, Slovakia, and Ukraine.

References

obsoletus obsoletus
Beetles described in 1815
Beetles of Europe